A list of alumni of University College, Oxford. University College, Oxford is one of the constituent colleges of the University of Oxford.  Its alumni include politicians, lawyers, bishops, poets, and academics. The overwhelming maleness of this list is partially explained by the fact that for over 95% of its history (from its foundation in 1249 until 1979), women were barred from studying at University College.

Alumni
The sub-headings are given as a general guide and some names might fit under more than one category.

Abbreviations used in the following tables
M – Year of matriculation at University College (a dash indicates that the individual did not matriculate at the college)
G – Year of graduation / conclusion of study at University College (a dash indicates that the individual graduated from another college)
DNG – Did not graduate: left the college without taking a degree
? – Year unknown; an approximate year is used for table-sorting purposes.
(F) after name – later became a Fellow of University College, and included on the list of Fellows
(HF) after name – later became an Honorary Fellow of University College

Degree abbreviations
Undergraduate degree: BA – Bachelor of Arts
Postgraduate degrees:

BCL – Bachelor of Civil Law
BD – Bachelor of Divinity
BLitt – Bachelor of Letters
BMus – Bachelor of Music
BSc – Bachelor of Science
BTh – Bachelor of Theology
MA – Master of Arts
MB – Bachelor of Medicine
MD – Doctor of Medicine

MLitt – Master of Letters
MSc – Master of Science
MPhil – Master of Philosophy
DCL – Doctor of Civil Law
DD – Doctor of Divinity
DLitt – Doctor of Letters
DMus – Doctor of Music
DPhil – Doctor of Philosophy
DTh – Doctor of Theology

The subject studied and the degree classification are included, where known.  Until the early 19th century, undergraduates read for a Bachelor of Arts degree that included study of Latin and Greek texts, mathematics, geometry, philosophy and theology.  Individual subjects at undergraduate level were only introduced later: for example, Mathematics (1805), Natural Science (1850), Jurisprudence (1851, although it had been available before this to students who obtained special permission), Modern History (1851) and Theology (1871). Geography and Modern Languages were introduced in the 20th century. Music had been available as a specialist subject before these changes; medicine was studied as a post-graduate subject.

Politicians and civil servants 

 Charles Jenkinson, 1st Earl of Liverpool, longest-serving President of the Board of Trade, namesake of the Hawkesbury River
 William Windham, Secretary of State for War and the Colonies
 William Scott, 1st Baron Stowell, Camden Reader of Ancient History, judge of the Admiralty Court, MP for Oxford University
 Sir Roger Newdigate, MP for Middlesex and for Oxford University, establisher of the Newdigate Prize
 Lord Butler of Brockwell, civil servant, college master
 Jacob Pleydell-Bouverie, 2nd Earl of Radnor, MP for Salisbury
 Sir Banastre Tarleton, British military leader during the American Revolutionary War and later Whig MP for Liverpool
 Sir Angus Mackintosh, British diplomat

Clergy
 George Abbot, Archbishop of Canterbury (1611–33)
 John Potter, Archbishop of Canterbury (1737–47)
 Tobias Matthew, Archbishop of York (1606–28)
 Anthony Fisher, Catholic Archbishop of Sydney 2014–present, Bishop of Parramatta 2010–2014
 Richard Fleming, bishop of Lincoln (1420–31)
 George Horne, bishop of Norwich (1790–92)
 Herbert Sidney Pelham, bishop of Barrow-in-Furness 1926–1944
 Richard Godfrey Parsons, bishop of Middleton 1927–32, bishop of Southwark 1932–41, bishop of Hereford 1942–48
 Grandage Edwards Powell, bishop of Penrith 1939-44
 Tom Longworth, bishop of Pontefract 1939–49, bishop of Hereford 1949–61
 Peter Mumford, bishop of Hertford 1974–81, bishop of Truro 1981–89
 Malcolm Menin, bishop of Knaresborough 1986–97
 Christopher Chessun, Bishop of Southwark 2011–present, Bishop of Woolwich 2005-2011
 Arthur Penrhyn Stanley, Dean of Westminster 1863-81, Rector of St Andrews 1874-77
 Charles Boyd, Archdeacon of Colombo (1891-1901)

Architects 

 Jack Diamond, architect of Mariinsky Theatre II and Sidney Harman Hall
 Sir Philip Dowson, architect of four accommodation blocks at Stavertonia

Artists and writers

 Edwin Arnold, poet, journalist, translator from Hindi
 Peter Bayley, literary critic
 Augustus Hare, writer
 Michael Brand, composer
 W. G. Collingwood, artist
Kodwo Eshun writer, theorist and filmmaker
 Maurizio Giuliano, writer, traveller, and United Nations official
Ivo Graham, comedian and writer
 Fred Harrison (born 1944), author and economist
 Armando Iannucci, comedian, writer, satirist and radio producer
 Richard Ingrams, co-founder of Private Eye
 Richard Jago, poet
 Gerard Langbaine, biographer
 C. S. Lewis, writer, critic; student there from 1919 to 1923 (originally joined in 1917 but left soon afterwards after being called up for action in the Great War); Philosophy tutor from 1924 to 1925
 Peter McDonald, poet
 Cecil Mercer, novelist
 Andrew Motion, British Poet Laureate
 Neel Mukherjee, novelist
 Shiva Naipaul, novelist and writer
 Sir V. S. Naipaul, writer and Nobel Laureate
 Andrew Robinson, author and former newspaper editor
 Aubrey de Sélincourt, writer and classicist
 William Shawcross, chairman of the Charity Commission for England and Wales, writer
 Desmond Shawe-Taylor, artist
 Percy Bysshe Shelley, poet
 Sophie Solomon, violinist, songwriter and composer
 Charles Sorley, poet
 Stephen Spender, poet and writer
 Mams Taylor, recording artist/songwriter, mixed-martial arts fighter and activist
 Rajiva Wijesinha, writer
 Fabian S. Woodley, poet
Braham Murray, theatre director

Philosophers and theologians
 F. H. Bradley, Idealist philosopher
 Frederick Cornwallis Conybeare, orientalist and religious thinker
 A. C. Ewing, philosopher
 A. D. Lindsay, 1st Baron Lindsay of Birker, Scottish political philosopher and historian of philosophy, Master of Balliol College, Oxford
 R. G. Collingwood, Idealist philosopher and archaeologist
 Gareth Evans, philosopher of language and mind, Wilde Reader in Mental Philosophy
 Kwasi Wiredu, Ghanaian philosopher
 Willie E. Abraham, Ghanaian philosopher, first African fellow of All Souls College, Oxford
 John Finnis, Australian legal philosopher
 Mark de Bretton Platts, philosopher of language
 Peter Singer, Australian moral and political philosopher, Ira W. DeCamp Professor of Bioethics (Princeton University)
 Jeremy Waldron, New Zealander political and legal philosopher, former Chichele Professor of Social and Political Theory
 Owen Fiss, American jurist, Sterling Professor (Yale University)
 Mortimer Sellers, American jurist
 Irving Singer (did not take degree), American philosopher
 David O. Brink (visiting student), American moral and political philosopher

Broadcasters, journalists and entertainers 

 Peter Beinart, The New Republic 1999–2006, editor-at-large 2006– 
 Nick Denton, founder of Gawker media
 Edward Enfield, broadcaster and writer
 Paul Foot, journalist and socialist
 Paul Gambaccini, presenter of and writer on pop music
 Gordon Honeycombe, actor and playwright
 Tom Hooper, Academy Award-winning director
 Aboubakr Jamaï, journalist
 Owen Jones, author and journalist 
 Christina Lamb, journalist and author
 Warren Mitchell, actor
 James Owen, writer and journalist
 Nigel Playfair, actor and theatre manager
 Mike Ratledge, keyboardist and composer
 James Ridley, author
 Nick Robinson, journalist and BBC political editor
 Rajdeep Sardesai, journalist
 Peter Sissons, television newsreader
 Philippa Thomas, journalist and chief presenter at BBC World News
 Alex Thomson, television journalist
 Michael York, actor
 Andy Zaltzman, political comedian

Scientists, inventors and engineers 

Bob Allen, surgeon
Bill Roscoe, computer scientist
Paul Thompson (neuroscientist), neuroscientist

Social scientists, historians and philologists 
 Ernst Badian, classical scholar, John Moors Cabot Professor of History Emeritus at Harvard University
James Franck Bright, historian, Master of University College, Oxford
 Hedley Bull, Australian scholar of international relations
Robin Darwall-Smith, archivist of University College
 E. R. Dodds, Irish classicist, Regius Professor of Greek (Oxford)
Katharine Ellis, music historian
Christopher Fyfe, historian of west Africa
 Norman Hampson, historian of the French Revolution
 Kenneth Hamilton Jenkin, historian
Sir William Jones, Anglo-Welsh philologist, discoverer of Sanskrit's relationship to Latin and Greek
 Monier Monier-Williams, linguist, Boden Professor of Sanskrit
 Herman Ramm, archaeologist
Geoffrey Serle, Australian historian
 Ernest de Sélincourt, literary critic and editor
E. V. Gordon, Canadian philologist, editor and teacher of medieval Germanic languages
 Aly Kassam-Remtulla, Canadian anthropologist

Sports people
 John Allen, Australian teacher, rugby player and cricketer
 Francis Birley, three-time winner of the FA Cup in the 1870s
 Mark Evans, Canadian rower, Olympic Gold Medallist in the 8+, Los Angeles 1984 Olympics
 J. Michael Evans, Canadian rower, Olympic Gold Medallist in the 8+, Los Angeles 1984 Olympics
 Thomas Gubb, rugby union international, represented Great Britain on 1927 British Lions tour to Argentina
 Nick Mallett, rugby player and coach
 Charles Thomas McMillen, retired NBA professional basketball player, US congressman
 Richard Nerurkar, Olympic athlete
 Acer Nethercott, British coxswain, Olympic silver medallist for GB 8+, Beijing 2008 Olympics
 James Parker, rower
 Tom Solesbury, GB pair, Beijing 2008 Olympics, and GB quad, London 2012 Olympics
 Adrian Stoop, rugby player
 Ralph Williams, cricketer and barrister

Judges and lawyers
 Christian Cole, Inner Temple member and first black graduate of Oxford University
 Kenneth Diplock, judge and Law Lord
 Andrew Edis, judge
 Robert A. Gorman (born 1937), law professor at the University of Pennsylvania Law School
 Neil Gorsuch, Associate Justice of the United States Supreme Court
 John Dyson Heydon, Justice of the High Court of Australia
 David Hodgson, Australian judge
 Jonathan Mance, Baron Mance, Justice of the Supreme Court of the United Kingdom
 Evelyn Monier-Williams, circuit judge
 Walter Paton (1853–1937), English barrister who played for Oxford University in the 1873 FA Cup Final
 Geoffrey Robertson, human rights barrister, academic, author and broadcaster
 Joseph Santamaria, Judge of the Court of Appeal of the Supreme Court of Victoria
 Raymond Wacks, Emeritus Professor of Law and Legal Theory, author
 Sir John Richardson, Puisne Judge of Common Pleas
 Sir David Edward KCMG PC QC FRSE, Scottish lawyer and academic, Judge of the European Court of Justice
 Oswald Cheung, barrister of Hong Kong, known as the "doyen of the bar"

Military 
 Francis Rawdon-Hastings, 1st Marquess of Hastings, general, Governor-General of India
 Bernard W. Rogers, four-star general, Chief of Staff of the U.S. Army
 John Rawlins, surgeon vice-admiral, Medical Director-General of the Royal Navy

Business people 
 Kevin Hartz, co-founder of Eventbrite and early-stage investor
David Hatendi, banker, founder of Hatendi Private Equity Advisors, Zimbabwe's first black Rhodes Scholar.
Bruno Schroder, billionaire banker
Simon Thompson, chairman of 3i, former chairman of the Tarmac Group and Tullow Oil
 Edward W. Scott, founder of BEA Systems and former senior United States government official

Other

 G.G. Bradley, noted Latinist, college master
 Chelsea Clinton, daughter of Bill Clinton, the 42nd U.S. President, and the former U.S. Secretary of State, Hillary Clinton
 Michael Hoban, headmaster of Harrow School
 Luke McShane, chess Grandmaster
 Joseph Bennet Odunton, Ghanaian public servant, first black African to hold appointment at the Buckingham Palace
 Sir Alan Stewart, founding vice-chancellor of Massey University, New Zealand
 Edward Maunde Thompson, Principal Librarian British Museum 1888–98, Director and Principal Librarian 1898–1909
 Israel Tonge, conspirator
 Felix Yusupov, participant in the murder of Grigori Rasputin

Future fellows 
A number of alumni became fellows at their Alma mater at some point in their academic career. Honorary fellows are marked with an asterisk.

John Appleton, academic and later Master
Peter Bayley, literary critic
Thomas Bennet, academic and later Master
Thomas Benwell, academic and later Master
Joseph Bingham, historian
Jon Blundy, geologist
George Granville Bradley, priest and later Master of the college
James Franck Bright, historian and later Master
John Browne, academic, later Master
Robert Burton, academic and later Master
Roger Cashmore, physicist
Richard Clayton, canon and later Master
Bill Clinton*, 42nd President of the United States
Thomas Cockman, academic and later Master
George Croft, priest
Horace Davey, judge and politician
E. R. Dodds, classicist
Gareth Evans, philosopher
Robin Fearn, diplomat
Thomas Foston, Master of the college
Valpy French, Christian missionary
John Finnis, legal philosopher
Laurence Grensted, priest and chaplain of University College
Edmund Lacey, bishop and later Master
Reginald Walter Macan, classical scholar and later Master
Jonathan Mance*, judge
Peter Medd, priest
James Plaskitt, politician
Thomas Plumer, lawyer and politician
Frederick Charles Plumptre, classicist and later Master
David Renton*, politician
 Bill Roscoe, computer scientist
Sir Amherst Selby-Bigge, civil servant and academic
William Smith, antiquary and author of The Annals of University College
Travers Twiss, jurist
Obadiah Walker, historian and later Master
Abraham Woodhead, writer

See also
 Former students of University College
 Fellows of University College, Oxford
 Alumni of University College Players, college dramatic society

Notes

References

External links
 Famous alumni, Archive.org

Alumni
Alumni
University College, alumni